Lockheed Martin Australia is a wholly owned subsidiary of Lockheed Martin Corporation, with 1,200 local staff. It is one of the largest suppliers of materiel, technology, services and training to the Australian Defence Force. These include guided weapons, naval aviation combat systems, combat aircraft, transport aircraft and space domain awareness.

Governance and leadership 
The current CEO of Lockheed Martin Australia is Warren McDonald, reporting to the VP of International Business. McDonald is a retired RAAF Air Marshal where he served as the inaugural Chief of Joint Capabilities. The company is headquartered in Canberra with major centres in Adelaide and Melbourne. The business is registered as an Australian proprietary company with its own board. Board members have included Kim Beazley, former CAF Geoff Brown and Amanda Vanstone. The company has an executive structure which may include the following business units:

 Australian Defence Strategic Capabilities Office. This includes the sovereign guided weapons capability. 
 Operations, Rotary and Mission Systems. Includes Integrated Air and Missile Defense, radars and sensors; cyber; electronic warfare, helicopters and global training systems.  
 Naval Combat & Missile Defence Systems. The Aegis Combat System is part of this unit.  
The capabilities produced by the company align with the domains of the Australian military.

Australian Army 

In 2023 the Australian Government selected Lockheed Martin to supply the Australian Army with their High mobility artillery rocket system. HIMARS is a missile launcher with six guided missiles that was deployed in Australia at Exercise Talisman Sabre in 2021. Australia plans to be equipped with 20 systems, including launchers, missiles and training rockets. This is understood to increase the range of Australian army strike weapons from the current 30–50 km to up to 300 km, and potentially 499 km. This was described by Australia's defence industry minister as “largest expansion of army strike capability in living memory.” Further missile capability may be enhanced by local manufacturing in a joint venture with Thales Australia.

In the past, Lockheed Martin has supplied the Australian Army with Javelin anti-tank missiles, used by the ADF since the 2003 Gulf War. The company also supplies the army with Target Acquisition Designation Sight/Pilot Night Vision Systems for its fleet of Apache attack helicopters.

Royal Australian Navy 

The company also supplies air capabilities to the country's navy, particularly its submarine hunter, the MH-60R Seahawk. Between 2013 and 2016, the Royal Australian Navy sourced 24 of the aircraft, with a further 12 ordered in 2022. These are maintained by the subsidiary Sikorsky Aircraft Australia in Nowra, New South Wales.

The Aegis Combat System is also provided by Lockheed Martin Australia for the RAN's Hobart-class destroyers.

The combat capabilities of Australia's future nuclear powered attack class submarines will be supported by the company. This includes the submarine-launched Mark 48 heavyweight torpedo. In turn, Lockheed Martin Australia looks to local companies to contract to them. This has included Attack Class Submarine Combat System R&D.

Royal Australian Air Force 

The Lockheed C-130 Hercules has been continuously produced by the American parent company since 1954, and there have been C-130s in Australian service since 1958. It's also considered by the air force as the future for medium load, tactical transport. Currently the RAAF has 12 of the aircraft, expected to be extended to 24, based at RAAF Base Richmond. It is reported that the RAAF may purchase six KC-130J Air Refuelling Tankers, providing  a hose-and-drogue refuelling capability to the RAAF's F/A-18s and Growler EA-18G electronic attack aircraft.

The RAAF also operates two Lockheed AP-3C Orion electronic signals intelligence aircraft out of RAAF Base Edinburgh, with a view to moving to the MC-55A Peregrine.

Australia's selection of the Lockheed Martin F-35 Lightning II as its joint strike fighter was the country's largest defence acquisition to date.

The first F-35s were delivered into Australian service in 2018, with the full complement of 72 expected by 2024. Their first appearance at an international combat exercise in Australia was at Exercise Pitch Black in 2022. As of June 2022, there were 50 of the fighter aircraft in service. Australia's F-35s are now in service across four RAAF aircraft units:

 No. 2 Operational Conversion Unit – the RAAF's dedicated F-35 training and operational conversion units for pilots and maintenance personnel.
 No. 3 Squadron – which, for a time, was based at Luke Air Force Base and is now at RAAF Base Williamtown where 200 Lockheed Martin Australia staff are situated.  
 No. 75 Squadron – with 16 of the F-35s, are based at RAAF Base Tindal.
 No. 77 Squadron – from 2021, based in Williamtown.

Lockheed Martin Australia also provides a training system for the RAAF pilots. This includes Pilatus PC-21 training aircraft, along with flight simulators, cockpit trainers and system sustainment.

Joint domain and space 
The company identifies space as the next defence domain for expansion, working with Australian tech contractors such as Av-Comm t develop satellite ground stations. The University of New South Wales signed a two year MOU with the company to jointly produce education programs along with research and development in 2022. Lockheed Martin Australia has invested in a National Integrated Air and Missile Defence (IAMD) Ecosystem in Australia, a $74 million facility, thought to be based in Williamtown, NSW. Joint threat detection capabilities are being developed through its STELaRLaB project in Melbourne, the integrated system is expected to detect and neutralise improvised threats.

References

External links
 Lockheed Martin Australia

Australian subsidiaries of foreign companies
Lockheed Martin